The Ampereae is a tribe of the subfamily Acalyphoideae, under the family Euphorbiaceae. It comprises 2 genera.

See also
 Taxonomy of the Euphorbiaceae

References

Acalyphoideae
Euphorbiaceae tribes